AJ Odasso (born 1981) is an American queer, intersex, nonbinary author and poet with a published career dating back to 2005. They are also a six-time Hugo nominee in the Semi-Prozine category in their capacity as Senior Poetry Editor for the speculative fiction magazine, Strange Horizons. An English Faculty member at San Juan College, Odasso holds a Master of Fine Arts degree in Creative Writing from Boston University, and they are currently enrolled in the Rhetoric & Writing doctoral program at the University of New Mexico.

Writing career
Odasso began their published career in 2005 while an undergraduate at Wellesley College, since then producing poetry, nonfiction, and short stories for magazines and anthologies. Their poetry has been published in Sybil's Garage, Mythic Delirium, Midnight Echo, Not One of Us, Dreams & Nightmares, Strange Horizons, Liminality, Stone Telling, Farrago’s Wainscot, Battersea Review, Barking Sycamores, Goblin Fruit and New England Review of Books. Solo collections include: Lost Books (Flipped Eye Publishing), published 2010, The Dishonesty of Dreams (Flipped Eye Publishing), published 2014, and The Sting of It (Tolsun Books), published 2019, originally shortlisted for the 2017 Sexton Prize as Things Being What They Are. They have also published a historical fiction novel, The Pursued and the Pursuing (DartFrog Blue), a continuation of The Great Gatsby.

Odasso is also Senior Poetry Editor for Strange Horizons, a weekly speculative fiction and non-fiction magazine, where they have worked since 2012.

Personal life
Currently living in New Mexico, Odasso holds a Master of Fine Arts degree in Creative Writing from Boston University. They are a full-time English Faculty member at San Juan College and a Doctor of Philosophy candidate in Rhetoric & Writing at the University of New Mexico. They are intersex, identifying as pansexual and non-binary. They are also Jewish and on the autism spectrum.

Awards

Solo works
Lost Books: 2010 London New Poetry Award nominee; 2010/2011 The People's Book Prize winner, Fiction Category, Winter 2010
Things Being What They Are: 2017 Sexton Prize shortlist
The Sting of It: 2019 New Mexico/Arizona Book Award winner, Gay/Lesbian (GLBT) category
The Pursued and the Pursuing: 2021 Reads Rainbow Award, 2nd Place, Historical Fiction category

Strange Horizons Senior Poetry Editor
Hugo Award Finalist, Semi-Prozine category, 2013, 2014, 2016, 2018, 2020, 2022

References

External links
 , including CV, links, reviews, and contact information.

American LGBT poets
Living people
People on the autism spectrum
Queer writers
Intersex writers
Intersex non-binary people
Transgender non-binary people
21st-century American poets
21st-century LGBT people
21st-century American Jews
Jewish American writers
Transgender Jews
1981 births
Pansexual non-binary people
American transgender writers
American non-binary writers